The Hour of the Gate (1984) is a fantasy novel by American writer Alan Dean Foster. The book follows the continuing adventures of Jonathan Thomas Meriweather who is transported from our world into a land of talking animals and magic. It is the second book in the Spellsinger series.

Plot introduction
Barely accustomed to the strange new world in which he has found himself trapped, Jon-Tom accompanies the wizard Clothahump to try to mount a defense against the invasion of the monstrous insectoid Plated Folk.  He and his otter companion Mudge, along with other allies gained in "Spellsinger", find themselves faced with ever more serious obstacles: From an underground river that leads to the four waterfalls known as The Earth's Throat, to the spider-silk city of the wary Weavers and their horrific arachnid queen, into the heart of Plated Folk territory, and even to the stars themselves.

External links

Alan Dean Foster homepage

1984 American novels
American fantasy novels
Novels by Alan Dean Foster
Spellsinger series